Windrose can refer to:

 Compass rose, a compass subdivision
 Compass rose network, a network composed by a group of Compass roses emerging from hexadecagon vertices
 Maupin Windrose, an American glider design
 Wind rose, a meteorologist's graphic tool
 Windrose 5.5, an American sailboat design
 Wind Rose Aviation, a Ukrainian airline